Joël Geissmann (born 3 March 1993) is a Swiss professional footballer who plays as a midfielder.

Career
Geissman is a youth product of FC Aarau, with loan stints with the academies of Grasshoppers and FC Baden. He began his senior career with FC Wohlen, on loan from Aarau, before signing formally with Wohlen in 2014 where he became the vice-captain at FC Wohlen. He transferred to FC Thun in the summer of 2016. He transferred to Lausanne-Sport in the summer of 2017 signing a three year contract, that was extended for 2 more years in 2020.

International career
Geissman is a youth international for Switzerland, having represented them from U17 to U19 levels.

References

External links
 
 
 

1993 births
Living people
Sportspeople from Aargau
Swiss men's footballers
Switzerland youth international footballers
Association football midfielders
Swiss Super League players
Swiss Challenge League players
FC Aarau players
FC Wohlen players
FC Thun players
FC Lausanne-Sport players